Kanimbla is a suburb of Cairns in the Cairns Region, Queensland, Australia.

Geography

The suburb straddles the upper reaches of Moody's Creek and is bordered to the north by the Cairns Western Arterial Road (state route 91). The main road that goes through Kanimbla is Ramsey Drive. Along the middle of the northern boundary is Whites Gap. In the south west elevations reach heights greater than 500 m towards the summit of Mooroobool Peak. Cairns Regional Council announced in 2013 that land had been purchased in Kanimbla to build a detention basin to alleviate seasonal flooding in suburbs downstream.

History

Kanimbla is situated in the Yidinji traditional Aboriginal country.

On 11 February 1989 the suburb was created from land previously in  Manoora and Mooroobool. The new suburb was named for the MV Kanimbla, a coastal passenger ship which had serviced Cairns before being pressed into military service during World War II (Manoora and Mooroobool also being the names of other coastal passenger ships).

Attractions
Campbells Lookout is on Lake Morris Road. It offers views across the Cairns suburbs to the Cairns CBD and Trinity Bay beyond. It is a popular lovers' lane.

References

External links 

Suburbs of Cairns
1989 establishments in Australia
Populated places established in 1989